Upper Tract is an unincorporated community in Pendleton County, West Virginia, United States.

Description

The community lies along U.S. Highway 220 at the confluence of Reeds Creek and the South Branch Potomac River. it has post office with a ZIP Code of 26866.

The community took its name from a nearby 18th-century pioneer settlement. Two local structures — the Cunningham-Hevener House and the Pendleton County Poor Farm — are listed on the National Register of Historic Places.

Upper Tract is notable as one of the driest places in the United States east of the Mississippi River, owing to an isolated rain shadow from Spruce Knob to the west. Between 1899 and 1930 Upper Tract averaged only  of precipitation, and in the extreme drought year of 1930 it received a remarkably low  for the entire year – the lowest annual precipitation ever recorded in the US east of the Mississippi, and indeed less than fell during that year in such dry cities as Tucson and San Diego.

See also

References

External links

Unincorporated communities in Pendleton County, West Virginia
Unincorporated communities in West Virginia